Incarvillea sinensis is a plant species in the genus Incarvillea.

Description
This species is native to Asia and grows to 2 feet tall at maturity. It flowers with rose-like pink flowers. The genus of this plant, Incarvillea is named after the French Jesuit missionary and botanist Pierre Nicholas Le Chéron d'Incarville.

Uses
The plant has been used in traditional Chinese medicine as an analgesic and as a treatment for rheumatism. Incarvillateine isolated from Incarvillea sinensis has demonstrated significant analgesic activity when compared to the opiate alkaloid morphine.

References

External links
 The showy floral displays of Incarvillea sinensis at the study site in Inner Mongolia, China.. Photo by Yin et al..

Bignoniaceae
Flora of Tibet